Steeden Sports is an Australian sports equipment manufacturing company, mainly focused on rugby league. The company is mostly known for its rugby league footballs. Steeden was established in Queensland in 1958, when twins Eric and Raymond Steeden opened a factory in Brisbane, Australia, producing leather cricket balls, rugby league balls and boxing bags. The company moved to New South Wales in the 1960s, and was acquired by British sporting goods corporation Grays International (marketed through its brand Gray-Nicolls) in 1995.

The company has a large range of rugby products that includes footballs, protective gear (shoulder pads, head protectors), clothing (uniforms), and accessories (bags). Steeden also produces netball uniforms.

Overview
The Steeden name has become so synonymous with rugby league in Australia that it is often used as noun to describe the ball itself. Other products Steeden produce are kicking tees, shoulder guards, bags, hit shields, boots, headgear, bibs, sock ties, whistles and water bottles.

Sponsorships
Steeden is the official ball supplier of the 2013 Rugby League World Cup, National Rugby League (NRL), Rugby League State of Origin, Australia Rugby League, New South Wales Rugby League, Queensland Rugby League, New Zealand Rugby League, Australian Touch Association, The Betfred Super League, Betfred Championship and the  Betfred League 1 and many more national governing bodies around the globe.

Steeden is also a partner of NRL teams Melbourne Storm, Penrith Panthers, South Sydney Rabbitohs and Wests Tigers

See also

 List of fitness wear brands
 List of sporting goods manufacturers
 List of companies of Australia

References

External links
 

Sportswear brands
Sporting goods manufacturers of Australia
Rugby league equipment
Manufacturing companies established in 1958
1958 establishments in Australia
Cricket equipment manufacturers